"Te slăvim, Românie" was the national anthem of the Romanian People's Republic, and later Socialist Republic of Romania between 1953 and 1975. It mentions Romania's brotherhood with the Soviet Union and praises Leninist ideology.

In the 1960s, in line with Romania's de-satellization, the reference to the "Soviet liberators" in the anthem was dropped.

It was replaced by "E scris pe tricolor Unire" in 1975, which only lasted until 1977 as Romania's anthem.

Lyrics (original; until the 1960s)

External links
<div class="plainlinks">
Sound file (mp3)

References
Sources

Further reading
 

Socialist Republic of Romania
Historical national anthems
National symbols of Romania
Romanian patriotic songs
European anthems
Year of song missing
Romanian-language songs